Maenoshin Yasuo  (born 17 April 1961 as Yasuo Sawabe) is a former sumo wrestler from Chikuho, Fukuoka, Japan. He made his professional debut in March 1977, and reached the top division in November 1985. His highest rank was komusubi. He retired in March 1990. He became an elder of the Sumo Association under the name Yamahibiki, but was forced to leave his position for disciplinary reasons in January 1997.

Career record

See also
Glossary of sumo terms
List of past sumo wrestlers
List of komusubi

References

1961 births
Living people
Japanese sumo wrestlers
Sumo people from Fukuoka Prefecture
Komusubi